Badman's Country is a 1958 American Western film directed by Fred F. Sears and written by Orville H. Hampton. The film stars George Montgomery.

Plot
Pat Garrett arrives in Abilene where he catches five of Butch Cassidy's gang. He calls in Wyatt Earp and Bat Masterson and they learn there is a half million dollar shipment of money arriving by train and Cassidy is amassing enough men to take it.

Cast
 George Montgomery as Pat Garrett
 Neville Brand as Butch Cassidy
 Buster Crabbe as Wyatt Earp
 Karin Booth as Lorna 
 Gregory Walcott as Bat Masterson
 Malcolm Atterbury as Buffalo Bill Cody
 Russell Johnson as Sundance 
 Richard Devon as Harvey Logan
 Morris Ankrum as Mayor Coleman
 Dan Riss as Marshal McAfee

References

External links
 

1958 films
1958 Western (genre) films
American Western (genre) films
American crossover films
Cultural depictions of Bat Masterson
Cultural depictions of Buffalo Bill
Cultural depictions of Butch Cassidy and the Sundance Kid
Cultural depictions of Pat Garrett
Cultural depictions of Wyatt Earp
1950s English-language films
Films directed by Fred F. Sears
Warner Bros. films
1950s American films